HMS Southwold was a Type II British  built for the Royal Navy during World War II. She served in the Mediterranean for a few months until she was sunk off Malta in March 1942.

History
Southwold was ordered on 20 December 1939, and was built by J. Samuel White and Company of East Cowes as part of the 1939 emergency program. Her keel was laid on 18 June 1940 with Job number J6274, and the ship was launched on 29 May of the following year. The vessel was completed on 9 October 1941.

After she was completed, Southwold went to Scapa Flow for trials, after which she joined the Mediterranean Fleet. On 16 November 1941 Southwold joined convoy WS12Z at the ocean escort Clyde Assembly point. The ship detached from the convoy on 14 December and made an independent passage from Mombasa to Alexandria.

On 5 January 1942 she joined the 5th Destroyer Flotilla for patrol and convoy escort duties. She deployed a supply of stores and embarked troops to Tobruk. On 12 February she was part of the Malta Convoy MW9B but the convoy was under heavy air attack so it returned to Alexandria.

On 20 March 1942, she carried out an anti-submarine sweep along planned path for Malta relief convoy MW10 along with some other destroyers. On 21 March, she joined this same convoy and took part in the Second Battle of Sirte a day later. On the 23rd she and  left the convoy to escort HMS Breconshire to Malta.

On 24 March, Southwold was attempting to pass a line to Breconshire when she activated a British mine and there was an explosion in which an officer and four ratings were killed . She sustained major structural damage and the engine room flooded while electrical supplies failed. She was towed by the tug Ancient but the hull split and she began to sink.

Wreck

References

Publications
 
 English, John (1987). The Hunts: a history of the design, development and careers of the 86 destroyers of this class built for the Royal and Allied Navies during World War II. England: World Ship Society. .

 

Hunt-class destroyers of the Royal Navy
Ships built on the Isle of Wight
1941 ships
World War II destroyers of the United Kingdom
Shipwrecks of Malta
World War II shipwrecks in the Mediterranean Sea
Maritime incidents in March 1942
Ships sunk by mines
Marsaskala